Carabus lineatus lateralis is a subspecies of green-coloured beetle in the family Carabidae that can be found in Portugal and Spain.

References

lineatus lateralis
Beetles described in 1840